The Petersburg Jail, at Main St. and 2nd St. in Petersburg in Boone County, Nebraska, was built in 1902 and was Petersburg's first freestanding municipal structure.  It was listed on the National Register of Historic Places in 1902.

Description
It is a  brick structure.

History
It originally was a single room, then was split by metal bars in 1926 to separate a jail cell from a marshal's desk space, and the bars have since been removed.

References

External links

Jails on the National Register of Historic Places in Nebraska
Buildings and structures completed in 1902
Buildings and structures in Boone County, Nebraska